Bush turkey may refer to:

 The Australian brushturkey, a mound-building bird from the family Megapodiidae found in eastern Australia
 The Australian bustard
 The orange-footed scrubfowl

See also
 Brushturkey